The 'apologetic' or parochial apostrophe is the distinctive use of apostrophes in Modern Scots orthography.

The practice, unknown in Older Scots, was introduced in the 18th century by writers such as Allan Ramsay, Robert Fergusson and Robert Burns as part of a process of Anglicisation. The 18th-century practice was also adopted by later writers such as Walter Scott, John Galt and Robert Louis Stevenson. It produced an easily understood spurious Scots that was very popular with English readers and on the English stage. It was also sometimes forced on reluctant authors by publishers desirous of a wider circulation for their books.

The custom "also had the unfortunate effect of suggesting that Broad Scots was not a separate language system, but rather a divergent or inferior form of English".

L-vocalisation 

Thus fou and pou, but the form fu functioning as the cognate of the suffix 'ful'. L also vocalised after  in closed syllables resulting in a diphthong which became  in Modern Scots, for example knowe (knoll), fowk (folk), gowf (golf) and gowd (gold).

Inflectional endings 

Consonant clusters 

Loss of consonants 
By the Middle Scots period,  and  deletion had occurred intervocalically and between a nasal/liquid consonant and a vowel. Hence spellings such as de'il (devil), gi'e (give), ha'e (have), lo'e (love), o (of), o'er (over) and sil'er (silver), the standard literary apostrophe-less spellings being deil, gie, hae, lue, o, ower and siller.

Also by that period, word-final  had been lost in a number of words. Hence spellings such as fro' (froth), quo' (quoth), wi' (with) and mou''' (mouth), the standard literary apostrophe-less spellings being fro, quo, wi and mou, the latter having the doublet mooth.

 Change of vowel 
In some Scots words the realisation differs from that of the Standard English cognate; hence spellings such as bak (bake), mak (make) and tak (take), the standard literary apostrophe-less spellings being bak, mak and tak.

 Legitimate use of the apostrophe in Scots 
Many words in Scots have both a full form and a contracted form. In contracted forms, an apostrophe is generally used in place of the elided graphemes, for example, e'en and even, e'er and iver (ever), eneu and eneuch (enough), lea and leave, ne'er and niver (never), ne'er's day and new year's day, nor'land and northland.

In the construction of the past tense or past participle, Scots often appends the apostrophe to verbs ending with ee to prevent three es from occurring in a single word:dee (die) > dee'dgree (agree) > gree'dScots also uses, as does English, the apostrophe to indicate contractions of multiple words: A'm (I'm), wi't (with it), ye're (you're), o't (of it).

 Notes 

 References 

 William Grant and David D. Murison (eds) The Scottish National Dictionary (SND) (1929–1976), The Scottish national Dictionary Association, vol. I Edinburgh.
 A History of Scots to 1700'' in A Dictionary of Older Scots Vol. 12. Oxford University Press 2002.

External links 
 Phonetic Description of Scottish Language and Dialects

Orthography
Scots language
Nonstandard spelling